XHDAB-FM is a radio station in Hidalgo del Parral, Chihuahua. Known as Radio Familia, XHDAB is owned by Dabar Radio, A.C.

History
The station received its permit in December 2012. XHDAB is the only permit (noncommercial) station in Parral.

References

Radio stations in Chihuahua
Christian radio stations in Mexico